No Time Like Tomorrow is a collection of science fiction stories, by British writer Brian Aldiss, published in 1959 as an original paperback by Signet Books.

Contents
 "T" (Nebula 1956)
 "Not for an Age" (The London Observer 1955)
 "Poor Little Warrior!" (F&SF 1958)
 "The Failed Men" (Science Fantasy 1956)
 "Carrion Country" (New Worlds 1958)
 "Judas Danced" (Star Science Fiction Magazine 1958)
 "Psyclops" (New Worlds 1956)
 "Outside" (New Worlds 1955)
 "Gesture of Farewell" (New Worlds 1957)
 "The New Father Christmas" (F&SF 1958)
 "Blighted Profile" (Science Fantasy 1958)
 "Our Kind of Knowledge" (New Worlds 1955)

"Judas Danced" was originally published as "Judas Dancing".

Reception
In his review column for F&SF, Damon Knight selected the novel as one of the 10 best genre collections of 1959.

References

1959 short story collections
Science fiction short story collections
Works by Brian Aldiss
Signet Books books